
Year 372 BC was a year of the pre-Julian Roman calendar. At the time, it was known as the Fourth year without Tribunate or Consulship (or, less frequently, year 382 Ab urbe condita). The denomination 372 BC for this year has been used since the early medieval period, when the Anno Domini calendar era became the prevalent method in Europe for naming years.

Events 
 By place 
 Greece 
 Jason of Pherae, the ruler of Thessaly, allies himself first with Athens and then with Macedon.

 By topic 
 Sports 
 Troilus of Elis wins two equestrian events at the Olympic Games, which leads to referees being banned from competing in the Games.

Births 
 Mencius, Chinese philosopher (d. c. 289 BC)

Deaths

References